Trematocara zebra is a species of cichlid endemic to Lake Tanganyika where it is known from rocky coasts of the northwestern coast of the lake.  It is an inhabitant of the sublittoral zone.  This species can reach a length of  SL.

References

External links
 Photograph

zebra
Fish described in 1996
Cichlid fish of Africa
Fish of Lake Tanganyika
Fish of the Democratic Republic of the Congo
Endemic fauna of the Democratic Republic of the Congo
Taxonomy articles created by Polbot